The 1928–29 Irish Cup was the 49th edition of the premier knock-out cup competition in Northern Irish football. 

Ballymena (who were only competing in their first season) won the tournament for the 1st and only time in their history, defeating Belfast Celtic 2–1 in the final at Solitude.

Results

First round

|}

Replay

|}

Quarter-finals

|}

Replay

|}

Semi-finals

|}

Final

References

External links
 Northern Ireland Cup Finals. Rec.Sport.Soccer Statistics Foundation (RSSSF)

Irish Cup seasons
1928–29 domestic association football cups
1928–29 in Northern Ireland association football